Complex dynamics is the study of dynamical systems defined by iteration of functions on complex number spaces. Complex analytic dynamics is the study of the dynamics of specifically analytic functions.

Techniques

General
Montel's theorem
Poincaré metric
Schwarz lemma
Riemann mapping theorem
Carathéodory's theorem (conformal mapping)
Böttcher's equation
Combinatorial
 Hubbard trees
 Spider algorithm
 Tuning
Laminations
Devil's Staircase algorithm (Cantor function)
Orbit portraits
Yoccoz puzzles

Parts
 Holomorphic dynamics (dynamics of holomorphic functions)
 in one complex variable
 in several complex variables
 Conformal dynamics unites holomorphic dynamics in one complex variable with differentiable dynamics in one real variable.

See also 
Arithmetic dynamics
Chaos theory
Complex analysis
Complex quadratic polynomial
Fatou set
Infinite compositions of analytic functions
Julia set
Mandelbrot set
Symbolic dynamics

Notes

References
Alan F. Beardon, Iteration of Rational Functions: complex analytic dynamical systems, Springer, 2000, 
Araceli Bonifant, Misha Lyubich, Scott Sutherland (editors), Frontiers in Complex Dynamics, Princeton University Press, 2014.
Daniel S. Alexander,  A History of Complex Dynamics: From Schröder to Fatou and Julia, Aspect of Mathematics, 1994, 
Lennart Carleson, Theodore W. Gamelin, Complex Dynamics, Springer, 1993, 
John Milnor, Dynamics in One Complex Variable (Third edition), Princeton University Press, 2006
Shunsuke Morosawa, Y. Nishimura, M. Taniguchi, T. Ueda, Holomorphic Dynamics, Cambridge University Press, 2000,

External Links
A Primer on the Elementary Theory of Infinite Compositions of Complex Functions

 
Emergence